Patrick Olalere (born 28 April 1972) is a Nigerian football manager and former player. He is the current coach of the Myrtle Beach FC.
A former professional player, he was active primarily in the United States, he played as a striker.

Career

College career
Olalere was born in Lagos, Nigeria.  He played college soccer at Carson-Newman College.

Professional career
In the summer of 1993, Olalere played for the Charleston Battery of the USISL.  In the fall of 1993, Olalere had an unsuccessful trial with the Buffalo Blizzard of the National Professional Soccer League.  In the spring of 1994, he signed with the New Orleans Riverboat Gamblers.  After an outstanding start to the season, scoring seven goals, the Fort Lauderdale Strikers of the American Professional Soccer League signed Olalere.  He finished the season with the Strikers, scoring only two goals.  He returned to the Charleston Battery in 1995 and remained with them until 1998, scoring 47 goals in 83 games.  In 1997, the New England Revolution selected him in the 1997 MLS Supplemental Draft.  He played one game before being released on April 16, 1997.  He then moved to the Jacksonville Cyclones before finishing the season with the Battery.  In 1998, he began the season with the Battery, but finished it with the Staten Island Vipers. In 1999, Olalere finished his career with the South Carolina Shamrocks.

Managerial career
In November 2011 he became head coach of the Myrtle Beach FC of the National Premier Soccer League (NPSL).

References

External links
 

1972 births
Living people
Sportspeople from Lagos
Carson–Newman University alumni
Nigerian footballers
Nigerian expatriate footballers
Nigerian expatriate sportspeople in the United States
Expatriate soccer players in the United States
American Professional Soccer League players
Charleston Battery players
Fort Lauderdale Strikers (1988–1994) players
Jacksonville Cyclones players
Major League Soccer players
New England Revolution players
New Orleans Riverboat Gamblers players
South Carolina Shamrocks players
Staten Island Vipers players
USISL players
USL Second Division players
A-League (1995–2004) players
New England Revolution draft picks
Association football forwards